Richard Lawrence Taylor (born 19 May 1962) is a British mathematician working in the field of number theory. He is currently the Barbara Kimball Browning Professor in Humanities and Sciences at Stanford University.

Taylor received the 2015 Breakthrough Prize in Mathematics  "for numerous breakthrough results in the theory of automorphic forms, including the Taniyama–Weil conjecture, the local Langlands conjecture for general linear groups, and the Sato–Tate conjecture." He also received the 2007 Shaw Prize in Mathematical Sciences for his work on the Langlands program with Robert Langlands. He also served on the Mathematical Sciences jury for the Infosys Prize from 2012 to 2014.

Career
He received his B.A. from Clare College, Cambridge. During his time at Cambridge, he was president of The Archimedeans in 1981 and 1982, following the resignation of his predecessor. He earned his Ph.D. in mathematics from Princeton University in 1988 after completing a doctoral dissertation, titled "On congruences between modular forms", under the supervision of Andrew Wiles. From 1995 to 1996 he held the Savilian chair of geometry at Oxford University and Fellow of New College, Oxford, and later became the Herchel Smith Professor of Mathematics at Harvard University, and held the Robert and Luisa Fernholz Professorship at the Institute for Advanced Study. He is currently the Barbara Kimball Browning Professor in Humanities & Sciences at Stanford University.

He received the Whitehead Prize in 1990, the Fermat Prize and the Ostrowski Prize in 2001, the Cole Prize of the American Mathematical Society in 2002, and the Shaw Prize for Mathematics in 2007. He was also elected a Fellow of the Royal Society in 1995. In 2012 he became a fellow of the American Mathematical Society. In 2015 he was inducted into the National Academy of Sciences.
He was elected to the American Philosophical Society in 2018.

Research
One of the two papers containing the published proof of Fermat's Last Theorem is a joint work of Taylor and Andrew Wiles.

In subsequent work, Taylor (along with Michael Harris) proved the local Langlands conjectures for GL(n) over a number field. A simpler proof was suggested almost at the same time by Guy Henniart, and ten years later by Peter Scholze.

Taylor, together with Christophe Breuil, Brian Conrad and Fred Diamond, completed the proof of the Taniyama–Shimura conjecture, by performing quite heavy technical computations in the case of additive reduction.

In 2008, Taylor, following the ideas of Michael Harris and building on his joint work with Laurent Clozel, Michael Harris, and Nick Shepherd-Barron, announced a proof of the Sato–Tate conjecture, for elliptic curves with non-integral j-invariant. This partial proof of the Sato–Tate conjecture uses Wiles's theorem about modularity of semistable elliptic curves.

Personal life
Taylor is the son of British physicist John C. Taylor. He is married, and has two children.

References

External links
His home page at the Institute for Advanced Study
 
Autobiography upon Shaw Prize acceptance

1962 births
Alumni of Clare College, Cambridge
20th-century British mathematicians
21st-century British mathematicians
Clay Research Award recipients
Fellows of New College, Oxford
Fellows of the American Academy of Arts and Sciences
Fellows of the American Mathematical Society
Fellows of the Royal Society
Members of the United States National Academy of Sciences
Harvard University faculty
Institute for Advanced Study faculty
Living people
Number theorists
Princeton University alumni
Savilian Professors of Geometry
Whitehead Prize winners
Fermat's Last Theorem
Members of the American Philosophical Society